Redelva was a notable Australian thoroughbred racehorse.

A chestnut son of Romantic Hope from the mare Delvena, he was foaled in 1983 and was trained throughout his career by Greg Varcoe.

Redelva competed primarily in sprint races winning up to a distance of 1400m. He was a durable horse winning quality races at the highest level as a two-year-old right through to the age of eight.

Amongst his major wins were the 1990 VRC Lightning Stakes, 1991 MVRC William Reid Stakes and the SAJC Spring Stakes on three occasions (1988–90).Redelva was primarily ridden throughout his career by Neville "Nifty" Wilson

Race record

61 starts - 21 wins, 13 seconds, 5 thirds

Prizemoney

A$1,791,710

Major wins 

Redelva won the following major races:

 1985 VRC Maribyrnong Trial Stakes – (900m) - Listed
 1987 SAJC City Stakes – (1000m) - Listed
 1987 SAJC Lightning Stakes – (1000m) – G3
 1988 SAJC R.N. Irwin Stakes – (1100m) – G2
 1988 SAJC Spring Stakes – (1200m) – G2
 1988 VRC Linlithgow Stakes – (1400m) – G2
 1988 VRC Rupert Steele Stakes – (1200m) – G2
 1988 VRC Standish Handicap – (1200m) – G3
 1989 SAJC Spring Stakes – (1200m) – G2
 1990 VRC Linlithgow Stakes – (1400m) – G2
 1990 SAJC Spring Stakes – (1200m) – G2
 1990 VRC Lightning Stakes – (1000m) – G1
 1990 MVRC Stanley Wootton Stakes – (1200m) – G3
 1991 VATC Rubiton Stakes – (1000m) – Listed
 1991 MVRC William Reid Stakes – (1200m) – G1
 1991 VATC Futurity Stakes – (1400m) – G1
 1991 VATC Memsie Stakes – (1400m) – G2

See also
 Repeat winners of horse races
 List of millionaire racehorses in Australia

References

 Redelva's pedigree and partial racing stats

1983 racehorse births
Thoroughbred family 7-d
Racehorses bred in Australia
Racehorses trained in Australia